Petru Hadârcă (born May 8, 1963 in Sângerei) is a director and actor from Moldova. He served as head of the National Theatre "Mihai Eminescu" in Chişinău.

Petru Hadârcă completed the B.V.Schukin Higher Theatre School (Institute) in 1985 and then he was a director and actor in Chişinău and Romania. He had a radio show on Vocea Basarabiei in Chişinău.

References

External links 
 Protesting Unions of Artists Say They Intend to Obtain Satisfaction of their Demands
 Petru Hadârcă vrea acasă
 Filme cu Melania Gheorghita, regizate de Petru Hadarca
 Petru Hadârcă
 Petru Hadarca
 Petru Hadârcă a adus "Piaţa Vladimir" la Bucureşti
 Piesa de teatru 'In Piata Vladimir'
 2002/2003 THEATRICAL YEAR: WHICH ARE THE PREMIERES?
 Reteta de vedeta – Petru Hadarca 
 Vocea Basarabiei, (AUDIO) Istoria în mişcare, ediţia de sâmbătă, 7 August 2010

1963 births
Living people
People from Sîngerei District
Moldovan male stage actors
Euronova Media Group